Perry Kyle Hummel (born July 23, 1935) is an American politician in the state of Iowa.

Hummel was born in Woodbury County, Iowa. He had a construction business and was also a real Estate broker. He served in the Iowa House of Representatives from 1979 to 1989, as a Republican.

References

1935 births
Living people
Iowa Republicans